Bolívar State  may refer to:
 Bolívar State (Venezuela)
 Bolívar State (Colombia) / Sovereign State of Bolívar

State name disambiguation pages